Franz Innozenz Stahl Nachbauer (1835–1902) was a famous German opera tenor.

Born in Giessen, he studied with Giovanni Battista Lamperti in Milan and with the celebrated baritone, Jan Krtitel Pisek, in Stuttgart. He made his debut on the stage in Passau in 1857 and was active until his retirement in 1890. He died in Munich.

Roles created
Walther von Stolzing in Wagner's Die Meistersinger on 21 June 1868.
Froh in Wagner's Das Rheingold on 22 September 1869.

References
Warrack, John and West, Ewan (1992), The Oxford Dictionary of Opera, 782 pages 

1835 births
1902 deaths
German operatic tenors
19th-century German male opera singers
People from Giessen